was a Japanese daimyō of the Edo period, who ruled the Owari Domain.

Biography
Tokugawa Gorōta was the eldest son of the 4th daimyō of the Owari Domain, Tokugawa Yoshimichi, by his official wife, Zuishō-in, the daughter of the court noble Kujō Tsukezane. Gorōta was only two years old when his father died, and he followed only two months later at the age of three. The direct line of succession for the Owari Domain passed to his uncle, Tokugawa Tsugutomo. With his death, the paternal line of Tokugawa Yoshinao came to end.

He was posthumously elevated to 3rd Court Rank. His grave is at the Owari Tokugawa clan temple of Kenchū-ji in Nagoya.

References 
 Papinot, Edmond. (1906) Dictionnaire d'histoire et de géographie du japon. Tokyo: Librarie Sansaisha...Click link for digitized 1906 Nobiliaire du japon (2003)
 The content of much of this article was derived from that of the corresponding article on Japanese Wikipedia.

1711 births
1713 deaths
Lords of Owari